Hejin is a county-level city of Yuncheng City, in the southwest of Shanxi province, People's Republic of China, located on the east (left) bank of the Yellow River. It borders Jishan and Wanrong counties to the east and south, Linfen to the north, and Hancheng in Shaanxi across the Yellow River to the west. The city and its surrounding area is home to abundant aluminium reserves. During the Qin Dynasty, Hejin was known as Pishi County, renamed to Longmen County during the Northern Wei, and finally Hejin County in the Song Dynasty. The city's name literally means "river ford", due to the need of a fording of the Yellow River at the time. In 1994, Hejin was upgraded to its present status as a county-level city.

Administrative divisions 
Hejin City administers two subdistricts, two towns, and five townships.

Climate

Transportation 
G5 Beijing–Kunming Expressway
China National Highway 108
China National Highway 209

References

External links

County-level divisions of Shanxi